1998 WNBA draft

On January 27, 1998, a total of 4 players were assigned to two teams in no particular order.  
On February 18, 1998, a WNBA expansion draft took place.
On April 28, 1998, the regular WNBA draft took place.
On September 15, 1998, two more players were assigned for the expansion draft of 1999.  See 1999 WNBA draft for more details.

Key

Initial player allocation

Expansion draft

College draft

Round 1

Round 2

Round 3

Round 4

References

Women's National Basketball Association Draft
Draft